Adel Safar (born 1953) is a Syrian politician and academic, who served as Prime Minister of Syria from 14 April 2011 to 23 June 2012. His government was dissolved by Bashar al-Assad as a result of the Syrian parliamentary election in 2012. He was Minister of Agriculture and Agrarian Reform from 2003 to 2011.

Early life and education
Safar was born in the Damascus countryside in Syria to a Sunni Muslim family. He earned a degree in Agronomy from the University of Damascus in 1977, a Diploma from the National School of Agronomy and Food Industries (ENSAIA) in Nancy, France in 1983, and a PhD in Biotechnology from ENSAIA in 1987.

Early career
Summary:
Agricultural Engineer at the Arab Center for the Studies of Arid Zones and Dry Lands (ACSAD), 1978-1981
Deputy lecturer at ENSAIA, 1981-1987
Deputy Dean for Administrative Affairs at the Faculty of Agriculture, Damascus University, 1992-1997
Member of the Permanent Committee for Agricultural Research at Damascus University, 1996-2001
Deputy Rapporteur of the Commission for Scientific Agricultural Research and Veterinary Medicine at the Supreme Council of Sciences, 1997-2001
Dean of the Faculty of Agriculture, Damascus University, 1997-2000
Member of the Advisory Committee of the Agricultural Productivity Administration at the Productive Projects Administration, 1999-2003
Secretary of Damascus University Branch of Arab Socialist Ba'ath Party, 2000-2002
Head of the National Committee for Man and the Biosphere Program in Syria, 2000-2004
Head of the Arab Network of Man and Biosphere Program in the Arab world, 2001-2004
Director-General of ACSAD, 2002-2003

Safar is also a member of the Economic Committee and a member of the High Council for Investment. He has been a member of the Ba'ath Party since 1990.

Cabinet of Syria
In September 2003, he was appointed Minister of Agriculture and Agrarian Reform in the cabinet of Muhammad Naji al-Otari. On 29 March 2011, he resigned, along with the rest of the Cabinet, at the request of
President Bashar al-Assad.

Personal life
Safar is married with four children.

See also
Cabinet of Syria
Politics of Syria

References

External links
Council of Ministers official government website
Prime Minister Dr. Adel Safar at SANA

Adel Ahmad Safar collected news and commentary at Silobreaker

1953 births
Arab Socialist Ba'ath Party – Syria Region politicians
Living people
People from Damascus
Prime Ministers of Syria
Agriculture ministers of Syria